Warham is a village and civil parish in the English county of Norfolk.

The villages name means 'Weir homestead/village'.

For the purposes of local government, the parish falls within the district of North Norfolk.

This small village has two large medieval churches, and used to have three. All Saints' is Grade II* listed; St Mary's Grade I. Originally there were three ecclesiastical parishes here, but the parishes were merged after the English Reformation. In the process, the church of St Mary the Virgin was demolished. It used to stand just east of All Saints, on the other side of the lane to Wighton.

Just south of the village is Warham Camp, a small hill fort earthwork built by the Iceni in the 2nd century BC, known locally as 'the Danish Camp'.

The village has a tiny request stop - Warham railway station - on the narrow gauge Wells and Walsingham Light Railway.

References

External links

Information from Genuki Norfolk on Warham All Saints parish.
Information from Genuki Norfolk on Warham St Mary Magdalen parish.
Information from NorfolkCoast.co.uk on Warham.

 
Villages in Norfolk
Civil parishes in Norfolk
North Norfolk